Norman Eugene Smith (March 18, 1908 – February 2, 1988) was a Canadian professional ice hockey goaltender who played for the Montreal Maroons and the Detroit Red Wings in the National Hockey League.

Rookie career
Smith enjoyed much success in his rookie years with the Montreal Maroons. He was playing his 20th game for the Maroons in 1930–31 when Howie Morenz was sent flying into the Maroons net and knocked off Smith, who was so badly injured that he was out for the rest of the season. Smith spent the next two seasons in the minors working on his rebound-control and all-around game. It was there in the minors that Smith started wearing his distinctive cap to stop the glare of the overhead lights from blinding him.

NHL career
In 1934, Smith was signed by the Detroit Red Wings. There, Smith played one of the most remarkable games ever in NHL history. He shut-out the Montreal Maroons in the NHL's longest game where he apparently lost  of body weight during the 176-minute, 30-second affair on the way to a Stanley Cup championship in 1935–36. His 92 saves in that same game are also a NHL record. Smith helped Detroit repeat as Stanley Cup Champions in 1936–37 and won the Vezina Trophy that same year. After suffering an arm injury, he slumped in 1937–38 and the Red Wings finished last. During a game in 1938–39, he did not show up, causing a rift with coach Jack Adams. He was then traded to Boston along with $15,000 U.S. cash on November 16, 1938 for Tiny Thompson, where there was no way he would beat out Frank Brimsek, and he was sent to the minors. Normie Smith retired rather than report to the minor leagues. He returned to play briefly with the Red Wings when World War II left a vacuum of players in the NHL.

Awards and achievements 
 Vezina Trophy (1937).
 NHL First All-Star Team goalie (1937).
 Stanley Cup Championship (1936, 1937).
 Holds NHL record for most saves in a game (92).

Career statistics

Regular season and playoffs

References

External links 
 
 

1908 births
1988 deaths
Canadian ice hockey goaltenders
Detroit Olympics (IHL) players
Detroit Red Wings players
Montreal Maroons players
Pittsburgh Hornets players
Quebec Castors players
Ice hockey people from Toronto
Stanley Cup champions
Vezina Trophy winners
Windsor Bulldogs (1929–1936) players
Canadian expatriate ice hockey players in the United States